MOIA may refer to:
 Ministry of Overseas Indian Affairs
 Shared ride service of Volkswagen Group